Shadows in Paradise is a 1986 Finnish art house comedy-drama film written and directed by Aki Kaurismäki. The film stars Kati Outinen as Ilona and Matti Pellonpää as Nikander.

Shadows in Paradise was awarded the Best Film award at the 1987 Jussi Awards.

This is the first film in Kaurismäki's Proletariat Trilogy (Shadows in Paradise, Ariel, and The Match Factory Girl). The trilogy has been released on Region One DVD by Criterion, in their Eclipse box-sets, and on region-free Blu-rays by Future Film in Scandinavia.

Plot
Ilona is a supermarket check-out clerk who meets Nikander, a lonely garbage man, and they develop romantic feelings towards each other.

Cast

References

External links
 
 
 
 
 
 
 

1986 films
Films directed by Aki Kaurismäki
1980s Finnish-language films
1986 comedy-drama films
Finnish comedy-drama films